Igreja de São João Baptista may refer to:

 Igreja de São João Baptista (Alcochete)
 Igreja de São João Baptista (Figueiró dos Vinhos)
 Igreja de São João Baptista (Tomar)
 Igreja de São João Baptista (Cimo de Vila da Castanheira)
 Igreja de São João Baptista (Moura)